Alimasi Freddy Mali (born 3 November 1984 in Kinshasa) is a basketball player from the Democratic Republic of the Congo. He represented DR Congo at the 2007 FIBA Africa Championship, where he scored 23 points in 42 minutes over 4 games.

References

1984 births
Living people
Basketball players from Kinshasa
Democratic Republic of the Congo men's basketball players
21st-century Democratic Republic of the Congo people